Diora Lynn Baird (born April 6, 1983) is an American actress and former model for Guess? who has appeared in films such as Wedding Crashers (2005), Accepted (2006), The Texas Chainsaw Massacre: The Beginning (2006), Young People Fucking (2007), My Best Friend's Girl (2008), Stan Helsing (2009), and Transit (2012).

Early life
Baird was born in Miami, Florida on April 6, 1983. Her mother was also a model. She got into acting when her mother enrolled her in an acting class to help her overcome introversion. Later, she became vice president of her school's Thespian Society.

At the age of 17, she moved to Los Angeles in hope of pursuing an acting career. To earn money while auditioning, she worked at The Gap as well as a clown at children's parties, caterer, waitress and pre-school teacher until breaking into the modeling industry, most notably with Guess?. Her exposure increased considerably with an appearance on the cover of the August 2005 issue of Playboy magazine. She was signed to Elite Model Management in Miami.

Career
In 2004, Baird also started earning acting roles, such as an appearance on the Drew Carey Show and in the low budget film Brain Blockers. Her breakthrough appearance in a major film was in Wedding Crashers in 2005, which she followed up with roles in Accepted and Hot Tamale. In 2006, she appeared in four films, most notably a major role in the horror film The Texas Chainsaw Massacre: The Beginning. In 2009, Baird portrayed an Orion Starfleet officer in Star Trek directed by J. J. Abrams but was cut from the final version of the film. She can be seen in the deleted scenes of the home video release.

Baird had featured photo spreads in several magazines including Playboy, FHM, Stuff, Maxim (in which she was ranked #76 on the Maxim magazine Hot 100 of 2007 list, #64 on the Maxim magazine Hot 100 of 2008 list, #76 on the Maxim Magazine Hot 100 of 2011 list, the #17 spot on FHM's top 100 2010, and the #40 spot in 2011), Toro and Esquire (UK).  She lent her voice to the Scarface video game as one of Tony Montana's possible girlfriends.

Baird has also guest starred in episodes of Big Day, Shark, The Loop, and Two and a Half Men (the 2009 episode "She'll Still Be Dead at Halftime"). She starred in the movie 30 Days of Night: Dark Days, directed by Ben Ketai, which is produced by Columbia Pictures and Ghost House Pictures. Baird stars in the FEARnet webseries Tea Party Macabre, which is part of the series "Women in Horror Month". She also starred in the 2009 comedy Stan Helsing.

She starred in a couple of videos for the Funny or Die website, including one with Garfunkel and Oates called "Go Running with Chicken" and "Sexy Dark Ages" with Robert Englund. She starred in another web video with the comedic duo called "This Party Took a Turn for the Douche". In 2010, she appeared in Night of the Demons. In February 2011, she starred in a short musical film called "Howlin' for You" for the band The Black Keys.

She plays a porn star in her 2014 film Beautiful Girl. Baird was cast in a recurring role in the Amazon Studios pilot Cocked along with costars Brian Dennehy, Jason Lee, Dreama Walker, and Sam Trammell. The show was not picked up for series. Baird guest starred in an episode of the Hulu series Casual.

Personal life
Baird was married to actor Jonathan Togo from 2013 to 2016; they have one child. In 2017, Baird revealed that she was dating comedian Mav Viola. Baird told The Advocate magazine that after years of assuming herself to be asexual, she identifies as queer. On December 29, 2017, Baird announced that she and Viola were engaged. They have since split up.

Filmography

Film

Television

Web
 Tea Party Macabre (2010), as herself; 5 episodes

Music videos
 "Howlin' for You" (2011), by The Black Keys
 "This Party Took a Turn for the Douche" (2011), by Garfunkel and Oates
 "Out of Goodbyes" (2011), by Maroon 5 featuring Lady Antebellum

Video game
 Scarface: The World is Yours (2006), as Femme Fatale (voice role)

References

External links

 
 

1983 births
21st-century American actresses
Actresses from Miami
Female models from Florida
American film actresses
American television actresses
American lesbian actresses
LGBT models
LGBT people from Florida
Living people
21st-century American LGBT people